The Last Dance is a 2020 American sports documentary miniseries co-produced by ESPN Films and Netflix. Directed by Jason Hehir, the series revolves around the career of Michael Jordan, with particular focus on the 1997–98 season, his final season with the Chicago Bulls of the National Basketball Association (NBA). The series features exclusive footage from a film crew that had an all-access pass to the Bulls, as well as interviews of many NBA personalities, including Jordan, Scottie Pippen, Dennis Rodman, Steve Kerr, and Phil Jackson.

The series aired on ESPN from April 19 to May 17, 2020, in the United States, while its episodes were released on Netflix internationally the day after their US airings; beginning on May 23, two episodes were aired back-to-back on ESPN's corporate partner ABC. ESPN2 aired an alternate version of the series intended for family viewing, which removed most of the profanity heard in the episodes. The series became available on Netflix on July 19, 2020.

It received critical acclaim, with praise for its directing and editing.  The Last Dance won the Primetime Emmy Award for Outstanding Documentary or Nonfiction Series at the 72nd Primetime Emmy Awards.

Synopsis 
The docuseries gives an account of Michael Jordan's career and the Chicago Bulls, using never-before aired footage from the 1997–98 Bulls season, his final season with the team.

Interviews
This is the list of the 90 persons interviewed for the documentary, ordered by air time.

Episodes

Production and release
The series features both interviews and never-released footage from the 1997–98 Chicago Bulls season. Over 500 hours of all-access footage was filmed and used to create the 10 part documentary series. According to Adam Silver (now NBA Commissioner, but then the head of NBA Entertainment), Jordan allowed the filming with the agreement that the footage would only be used with his direct permission. After many years, and many refusals from Jordan, he agreed in 2016 to a documentary  proposal from Mike Tollin.

ESPN and Netflix announced their joint production of the 10-part documentary series in May 2018, with the first official trailer being released on December 25, 2018. The release date was pushed back to June 2020 after another trailer was released in December 2019. However, because of the impact of the COVID-19 pandemic, ESPN published the final trailer on March 31, 2020 and expedited the premiere to April 19, 2020, releasing the following statement:

The series was released weekly from April 19, 2020 to May 17, 2020, with two episodes airing each Sunday. Outside of the United States, the episodes were released on Netflix the day after their ESPN airing. ESPN2 aired a censored version of the documentary alongside the ESPN broadcast. The censored version was also aired on ABC.

According to Hehir, Jordan refused to film interviews in his home to maintain privacy. The interviews were filmed in three houses, one rented by the production and two others which were homes of friends of the production. The fifth episode is dedicated to Kobe Bryant, who died in a helicopter crash on January 26, 2020. Bryant's interview was featured in the episode's opening.

Reception

Critical response
On review aggregator Rotten Tomatoes, the series holds an approval rating of 97% based on 62 reviews, with an average rating of 8.85/10. The website's critics consensus reads: "A compelling and comprehensive portrait of one of basketball's great teams, The Last Dances blend of archival footage and candid interviews confirms there's nobody quite like Mike or the team he led to victory." Metacritic, which uses a weighted average, assigned the series a score of 91 out of 100 based on 12 critics, indicating "universal acclaim".

Writing for Consequence of Sound, Robert Daniels gave The Last Dance a perfect score, calling the series "beautifully composed and edited together" and a "pulsating celebration of greatness." Similarly, Alex Pattle of The Independent praised director Jason Hehir, writing that "Hehir's fear of being formulaic fosters a compelling freshness, and his ability to subtly segue between tones ensures Jordan's auras of magnetism and intensity are highlighted at the appropriate moments", while Brian Lowry of CNN gave the series five stars out of five, saying that "it's a very, very deep dive, but for fans who will eat this stuff up, it hits all the right notes."

Chicago Sun-Timess Richard Roeper gave the series three and a half stars out of four, writing that "while some might question whether even one of the great team sports dynasties of all time merits such a lengthy treatment, if anything each episode left me wanting more. Not only were the Bulls a team for the ages, they also gave us a sports soap opera for the ages." Daniel Fienberg of The Hollywood Reporter gave the series a positive review, writing that "it's a tremendously engaging, ridiculously fun assemblage of spectacular basketball footage and reasonably introspective interviews with almost everybody you'd hope to hear from on the subject." Writing for The New York Times, Wesley Morris wrote that "Hehir has this trick where any time someone says something debatable or controversial or simply worthy of running by [Michael] Jordan, he hands him an iPad and makes him watch what was said. And every time Hehir does it, Jordan turns the reaction into gold. He's an incredulous Zeus in these moments, lightning bolts falling from his toga as he laughs, zapping lesser gods."

Conversely, filmmaker Ken Burns criticized Michael Jordan's involvement in the production of the series, saying that "if you are there influencing the very fact of it getting made, it means that certain aspects that you don't necessarily want in aren't going to be in [...] and that's not the way you do good journalism." Specifically, Burns pointed to Jordan's production company, Jump 23, being listed as a partner in the series. Hehir would respond to such speculations stating "I ran into zero stop signs in the editorial process. Michael was involved, but in a distant satellite-level while making it. He never came close to the editing room and only received cuts as they were about to go on air. I think Michael is above the fray when it comes to what he wants in and out.”

Response from the basketball community
While the series drew positive reactions from many current NBA players, several players featured in the documentary were critical of how they were portrayed. Scottie Pippen was reportedly "wounded and disappointed" by his characterization, though he did not make any public remarks during the documentary's airing. Pippen later denied any rift between himself and Jordan over the documentary, however, he told Jordan he was not pleased with the docuseries and considered it to be "about Michael trying to uplift himself and to be glorified". Jordan accepted Pippen's opinion, saying "hey, you’re right".

Horace Grant expressed a belief that the documentary was edited to favor Jordan, remarking that the series was "entertaining, but we know [...] that about 90% of it [was] BS in terms of the realness of it"; he also denied Jordan's accusation that Grant was the source for The Jordan Rules and agreed that Pippen was portrayed unfairly. Craig Hodges, who was not interviewed for the documentary, was "bothered" by Jordan's comments about the team's use of cocaine during the 1980s, remarking, "I was thinking about the brothers who [were on the team] with you who have to explain [what happened] to their families".

Some expressed disappointment over the omission of starting center Luc Longley in the series, and a 2021 episode of Australian Story was released with Longley's response, including interviews with ex-teammates such as Pippen and Jordan. There was also criticism on the overemphasis of Steve Kerr--a minor player on the Bulls last championship team--due to his recent success as the head coach of the Golden State Warriors, with it being compared to if ESPN did a documentary on the 1970s Pittsburgh Steelers and placed Tony Dungy (who like Kerr had a successful head coaching career but a forgettable playing career) in the same company as Joe Greene, Franco Harris, and Jack Lambert. Kerr himself admitted that they emphasized him more than what was needed.

US ratings
For the 2019–20 television season, the show tied for fifth among adults 18–49 in the Nielsen ratings with This Is Us, averaging a 2.9 rating and 15 share. It also placed 55th in total viewership, averaging 6.71 million viewers. Variety dubbed the show's performance a "consolation prize" for ESPN given the network's struggle to find live sports. The series also became ESPN's most-watched documentary.

The Last Dance : U.S. viewers per episode (millions)

Accolades

Notes

References

External links 
 
 
 

1997–98 NBA season
2020 American television series debuts
2020 American television series endings
2020s American documentary television series
2020s American television miniseries
30 for 30
Basketball television series
Chicago Bulls
Michael Jordan